The Super Eurobeat Presents Ayu-ro Mix remix album was released by Ayumi Hamasaki on February 16, 2000. The album became the second highest selling remix album in Japan of 2000 with 700,000 copies sold. The album became Hamasaki's longest charting remix album with over 31 weeks on the chart. It is the 4th best selling remix album in Japan and also the 9th best selling remix album worldwide of all time.

Track listing
 Fly High (Euro-Power Mix) (from Loveppears) 
 Appears (Aggressive Extended Mix) (from Loveppears) 
 Boys & Girls (A Eurosenti Mix) (from Loveppears) 
 Depend on You (Eurosenti Mix) (from A Song for ××) 
 Monochrome (Ayu-ro Extended Mix) (from Loveppears) 
 Too Late (Euro-Power Mix) (from Loveppears) 
 Trauma (Eurobeat Mix) (from Loveppears) 
 Trust (A Eurobeat Mix) (from A Song for ××) 
 Whatever (Sentimental Mix) (from Loveppears) 
 End Roll (Ayu-ro Extended Mix) (from Loveppears) 
 Poker Face (Eurosenti Mix) (from A Song for ××) 
 You (Aggressive Mix) (from A Song for ××) 
 To Be (Eurobeat Mix) (from A Song for ××) 
 immature (Sweet Mix) (from Loveppears) 
 kanariya (Power Mix) (from Loveppears) 

Copies sold: 650,000+ (Japan) 800,000 (Worldwide)

"J-Euro" 
Ayu-ro Mix is an album in the Super Eurobeat Presents : J-Euro series launched in 2000, along with Euro Every Little Thing featuring Every Little Thing, Hyper Euro MAX featuring MAX, Euro Global featuring globe, Euro "Dream" Land featuring Dream, and the successor Ayu-ro Mix 2. Several tracks on the album were later included on J-Euro Best and J-Euro Non-Stop Best.

Super Eurobeat Presents Ayu-ro Mix 2 is a remix album, consisting of recordings by Japanese singer Ayumi Hamasaki remixed by various eurobeat producers from Italy, released in the late 2001 by Avex Trax.

Like its predecessor Ayu-ro Mix, the album is an issue in the Super Eurobeat Presents: J-Euro series launched in 2000, along with Euro Every Little Thing featuring Every Little Thing, Hyper Euro MAX featuring MAX, Euro Global featuring globe, and Euro "Dream" Land featuring Dream. Several tracks on the album can also be found on J-Euro Non-Stop Best.

It is Hamasaki's only remix album to reach the #1 spot on the chart. The album sold a total of 435,760 copies by the end of its chart run.

Track listing
 Audience "Euro-Power Mix" (from Duty) – remixed by Dave Rodgers
 Evolution "Time Is Pop Mix" – remixed by Luca Degani and Sergio Dall'ora
 Seasons "A Eurobeat Mix" (from Duty) – remixed by Luca Degani and Sergio Dall'ora
 Duty "Power Mind Mix" – remixed by Laurent Newfield
 Vogue "Traditional Mix" (from Duty) – remixed by Dave Rodgers
 M "Sweet Heart Mix" (from A Best) - remixed by Laurent Newfield
 Never Ever "Eurobeat Mix" – remixed by Dave Rodgers
 Endless Sorrow "A Aggressive Mix" – remixed by Luca Degani and Sergio Dall'ora
 Far Away "ayu-ro Extended Mix" (from Duty) – remixed by Bratt Sinclaire
 Surreal "Time A Go-Go Mix" (from Duty) – remixed by Luca Degani and Sergio Dall'ora
 Appears "Melodic Extended Mix" (from Loveppears) – remixed by Luca Degani and Sergio Dall'ora
 Kanariya "Sweet Mix" (from Loveppears) – remixed by Laurent Newfield
 Immature "Power Mix" (from Loveppears) - remixed by Laurent Newfield
 Unite! "Euro-Power Mix" – remixed by Dave Rodgers

Chart positions

See also 
List of best-selling remix albums worldwide

References

External links
 SUPER EUROBEAT presents ayu-ro mix information at Avex Network.
 SUPER EUROBEAT presents ayu-ro mix information at Oricon.

Ayumi Hamasaki remix albums
Ayu-ro Mix
2000 remix albums
2001 remix albums